Atanas Dimitrov (born 17 April 1992) is a Bulgarian football midfielder who currently plays for Belasitsa Petrich.

Dimitrov's father Nikolay Dimitrov is former football player, who spent 9 seasons of his career at Litex Lovech, before retiring at the age of 35 in 2005.

Career
Dimitrov began his football career with Litex Lovech. On 14 June 2011, he signed his first professional contract with Litex. One months later, Dimitrov signed for Botev Vratsa on a season-long loan deal.

On 18 August 2016, following a short period out of football, Dimitrov joined Third League club Belasitsa Petrich where his father was appointed as manager. On 19 June 2017, he moved to Botev Vratsa. In June 2018, Dimitrov joined Bansko.

References

External links
 

1992 births
Living people
Bulgarian footballers
PFC Litex Lovech players
FC Botev Vratsa players
FC Chavdar Etropole players
FC Bansko players
FC Lokomotiv Gorna Oryahovitsa players
PFC Belasitsa Petrich players
OFC Vihren Sandanski players
First Professional Football League (Bulgaria) players
Second Professional Football League (Bulgaria) players
Association football midfielders